Tetragonoderus pallidus is a species of beetle in the family Carabidae. It was described by G.Horn in 1868. It is endemic to Tucson, Arizona.

References

pallidus
Beetles described in 1868
Taxa named by George Henry Horn